This is a list of public art in Kirkland, Washington.

This list applies only to works of public art accessible in an outdoor public space. For example, this does not include artwork  visible inside a museum.  

Most of the works mentioned are sculptures. When this is not the case (sound installation, for example) it is stated next to the title.

References

External links

Kirkland, Washington
Kirkland, Washington